Surubim is a city in the state of Pernambuco, Brazil. It is the birthplace of Chacrinha, a famous Brazilian comedian and entertainer who died in 1988.

Geography
 State - Pernambuco
 Region - Agreste of Pernambuco
 Boundaries - Vertentes do Lério and Casinhas  (N); Riacho das Almas and Cumaru  (S); Bom Jardim, Salgadinho and João Alfredo (E); Santa Maria do Cambucá and Frei Miguelinho  (W)
 Area - 252.85 km2
 Elevation - 394 m
 Hydrography - Capibaribe river
 Vegetation - Caatinga Hiperxerófila
 Climate - semi-arid, hot and dry
 Annual average temperature - 23.7 c
 Distance to Recife - 134 km

Economy
The main economic activities in Surubim are based in industry, commerce and agribusiness, especially the raising of cattle, pigs, goats, sheep and chickens.

Economic indicators

Economy by Sector
2006

Health indicators

References

Municipalities in Pernambuco